Achar! (English: Pickle) is a Singaporean English language sitcom that aired for two seasons, from December 2004 until late 2005. It starred Bollywood star Jas Arora, Lim Ru-Ping, Malti Lalwani, Timothy Loh, Steph Song, Rajesh Sabari aka Rajoo and Rui En. It revolved around an Indian man Ajay Chhabria (portrayed by Arora), who marries a Singaporean girl (played by Song and later Rui En). In some episodes is a special appearance by Nuraliza Osman, who plays Ajay's ex-girlfriend. Other cast members portray members of the couple's family. Its reruns are sometimes shown on MHz Worldview.

Cast
Jas Arora as Ajay Chhabria
Steph Song
Rui En
Lim Ru-Ping
Timothy Loh
Malti Lalwani
 Bridget Fernandez
 Christian Lee
Nuraliza Osman
Rajesh Sabari

Episodes

Season 2

Accolades

References 

Singaporean television series
Tamil diaspora in Malaysia